Reda Chaouch is a French former footballer who is last known to have played as a midfielder for HKFC.

Career

At the age of 17, Chaouch suffered an ankle injury, which required three surgeries.

Before the 2011 season, he signed for Hong Kong side HKFC.

References

External links
 

French footballers
Living people
Expatriate footballers in Hong Kong
French expatriates in Hong Kong
French expatriate footballers
Hong Kong Premier League players
Association football midfielders
Year of birth missing (living people)
Hong Kong FC players